The Clatskanie River is a tributary of the Columbia River, approximately  long, in northwestern Oregon in the United States. It drains a timber-producing area in the foothills of the Northern Oregon Coast Range north-northwest of Portland.

Major tributaries include Carcus Creek and the North Fork of the Clatskanie, which converge at Swedetown. The North Fork rises at Apiary. It flows generally north-northwest through the Clatsop State Forest, past Clatskanie.

The river is named for the Tlatskanai, an Athabascan tribe of Native Americans who lived in the valley of the nearby Nehalem River at the time of the arrival of Europeans in the early 19th century. There is also a Klaskanine River in Clatsop County which was really named for the same reason.   The names as used by the natives did not apply to the respective rivers, but applied to the path, route or trail by which one could get to the customary tribal area of the Tlatskanai.

Tributaries
Named tributaries of the Clatskanie River from source to mouth begin with the Little Clatskanie River, which enters from the right. Then comes Buck Creek, right; Falls Creek, left; North Fork, right; and Carcus, Page, Miller, and Vonberg creeks, all from the left. Then Langfeld and Keystone creeks, from the right; Perkins, Merril, Conyers, and Fall creeks, all from the left, and Beaver Slough (Beaver Creek), right.

See also
List of rivers of Oregon

References

Tributaries of the Columbia River
Rivers of Oregon
Rivers of Columbia County, Oregon
Oregon placenames of Native American origin